Civil conflict in Turkey is an internal armed conflict in the modern history of Turkey. Instances of such civil conflict include:
the Political violence in Turkey (1976–1980)
the Maoist insurgency in Turkey
Kurdish rebellions in Turkey (1920s-present)
the Kurdish–Turkish conflict (1978–present)
the Kurdish–Turkish conflict (2015–present)
the DHKP/C insurgency in Turkey
the Turkey–ISIL conflict

References

Conflicts in Turkey
Proxy wars
Wars involving Turkey